Paul Sablon (6 November 1888 – 3 November 1940), later Paul Bourgeois, was a Brussels-born actor, director, cinematographer, writer and animal trainer, who worked in the early film industry, including for Pathé Frères in Europe and Universal in the United States.

While working in the Netherlands, "Sablon became the regular cameraman for Alfred Machin’s tiger Mimir." He later toured with the Circus Hagenbeck, developing his animal training skills. During his American era he seems to have been a combination animal trainer, critically and commercially successful director, con man and workplace predator. “Bourgeois and his wife, actress Rosita Marstini, arrived in Hollywood in summer 1915” after he had worked with animals in New York and New Jersey. He was head animal trainer and Universal City Zoo superintendent from approximately 1915 to 1916. In 1916, he defrauded investors with an ice rink scheme and then absconded with the money and his 19-year-old stenographer to Arizona. He spent time in both Canada and the United States but died in his home country of Belgium.

Filmography
Actor:
 1912: Het vervloekte Geld (The Curse of Money)
 1913: Beasts of the Jungle
 1915: The Prisoner of the Harem
 1916: Hungry Happy’s Dream

Director or cinematographer, in Europe:
 1912: Babylas va se marier
 1912: L'Âme des moulins
 1912: Calvaire du mousse
 1912: L'Or qui brûle
 1912: De Molens die juichen en weenen
 1912: La Peinture et les cochons

Director, working in the United States under the name Paul Bourgeois:
 1915: Joe Martin Turns 'Em Loose
 1915: The Tiger-Woman
 1916: Nadine of Nowhere
 1916: The Whole Jungle Was After Him
 1916: On the Trail of the Tigress

Further reading

References

External links
 IMDb: Paul Bourgeois
 Nitrateville: The 1910s animal films of Paul Bourgeois

1888 births
1940 deaths
Belgian people
Animal trainers
Zoo directors

fr:Paul Sablon